Barzan can refer to:

Geography
 Barzan, Iraq, a city in northern Iraq
 Barzan, Iran, a village in Lorestan Province, Iran
 Barzan, alternate name of Sevaldi, a village in North Khorasan Province, Iran
 Barzan, Charente-Maritime, a town in France
 Bârzan, a village in Lupșa Commune, Alba County, Romania
 Barzan Palace, a devastated palace in Ha'il, Saudi Arabia
 Barzan souq, a market in Ha'il, Saudi Arabia

Other uses
 Barzan Ibrahim al-Tikriti, executed Iraqi politician and half brother of Saddam Hussein
 Barzan (Star Trek), a humanoid species in the Star Trek universe (see "The Price")
 MV Barzan, the longest container ship in world in May 2015